In naval parlance, the sail (American usage) or fin (British/Commonwealth usage) (also known as a fairwater) of a submarine is the tower-like structure found on the dorsal (topside) surface of submarines. Submarine sails once housed the conning tower (command and communications data center), the periscope(s), radar and communications masts (antenna), though most of these functions have now been relocated to the hull proper (and so the sail is no longer considered a "conning tower"). 
When above the water's surface, the sail serves as an observation platform. It also provides an entrance and exit point on the submarine that has enough freeboard to prevent the submarine being swamped. Under water, the sail acts as a vertical stabilizer. In some submarines, the sail also supports diving planes (or fairwater planes), which are control surfaces used for underwater stability and steering.

See also
 Dorsal fin

References

Submarine design
Submarine components